

Historical bridges

Major bridges

See also 

 Transport in Cuba

References 
 

 Others references

External links 
 
 

Cuba

Bridges
b